The Pera Palace Hotel is a historic special category hotel and museum hotel located in the Beyoğlu (Pera) district in Istanbul, Turkey. It was built in 1892 for the purpose of hosting the passengers of the Orient Express and was named after the place where it is located. It holds the title of "the oldest European hotel of Turkey".

The Pera Palace Hotel is located in the Tepebaşı neighbourhood of Pera, once known as "Little Europe". It is about 20 km from Atatürk International Airport.

The hotel is in walking distance of Istiklal Avenue, Taksim Square and the British, Swedish, Russian, Dutch, Italian, French and German consulates.

The hotel was closed from 2006, undergoing a major renovation and restoration project and reopened on September 1, 2010.

It was managed by Jumeirah Hotels as Pera Palace Hotel Jumeirah from 1 May 2012 to 2017.

History

Establishment work began in 1892 and the grand opening ball was held in 1895.

Alexander Vallaury, a French-Ottoman architect living in the city designed the hotel in a blend of neo-classical, art nouveau and oriental styles. Vallaury undertook a number of other projects in Constantinople (Istanbul), including the Ottoman Bank Headquarters and the Imperial Museum.

The hotel was the first building in the Ottoman Empire to be powered by electricity, other than the imperial palaces. It was also the only address in the city to provide hot running water for its guests and was home to the first electric elevator in Constantinople. It was also the second electric elevator in Europe.

One of the hotel's first owners were the Ottoman-Armenian Esayan family.

Architecture and renovation

Pera Palace Hotel is today regarded as an important historical building and is listed under the general protection of Turkish Law (No. 2863 of 1983, amended with Law No. 5226 of 2004) concerning cultural heritage in Turkey.

The exterior façade, as well as the layout of the property, follows a neo-classical approach. The interiors of the building feature a more oriental style, mostly concentrated in the ballroom interior. In keeping with this eclectic vision, art nouveau lines feature in and around the elevator and in the coffee house section.

Although a prominent symbol of Istanbul's cityscape, the Pera Palace property was in need of an extensive renovation. Consequently, in April 2008, the Beşiktas Shipping Group launched a Euro 23 million renovation and restoration project. KA.BA Conservation of Historic Buildings and Architecture directed the project alongside the Metex Design Group and the entire renovation project is completed on September 1, 2010.

A key attraction, the Atatürk Room 101 remains as a ‘Museum Room’, with many personal items and reading material of the founding leader of Turkey, Mustafa Kemal Atatürk exhibited to the public.

Literature and publications
 In Ernest Hemingway's short story The Snows of Kilimanjaro, the main character, writer Harry, stays at the Pera Palace Hotel while serving in the military during the Allied occupation of Constantinople in World War I.
 Henry Pulling and his aunt Augusta Bertram, protagonists of Graham Greene's 1969 novel, Travels With My Aunt, stay at the Pera Palace Hotel during their Istanbul adventure. The narrator Pulling is not enthusiastic about the quality of the food served.
 Detective writer Agatha Christie's 1934 novel Murder on the Orient Express was allegedly written in the Pera Palace Hotel. The hotel maintains Christie's room as a memorial to the author.
 The characters of Lainie and Celia in Erin Morgenstern’s 2011 fantasy novel The Night Circus stay at the Pera Palace Hotel in 1900.

In popular culture 

 The hotel serves as the main setting for the show Midnight at the Pera Palace, which was released on Netflix in March 2022.
 The hotel is where Tilda Swinton's character stays in Istanbul in the film Three Thousand Years of Longing.

See also
 Hotels in Istanbul

References

Further reading
 King, Charles. Midnight at the Pera Palace: The Birth of Modern Istanbul. New York: W. W. Norton & Company, 2014.

External links
 All about Turkey
 official website
 Series of pictures taken at the hotel

Rococo architecture in Turkey
Buildings and structures of the Ottoman Empire
Pera Palace
Hotel buildings completed in 1892
Hotels established in 1892
Buildings and structures in Beyoğlu
1892 establishments in the Ottoman Empire
Art Nouveau architecture in Istanbul
Art Nouveau hotels
Murder on the Orient Express
19th-century architecture in Turkey